Charles R. Rogers, also known as Chas. R. Rogers, was an American film producer whose career lasted from 1924 through 1957. Through most of his career he operated as an independent film producer, although he did have stints at both RKO and Universal, including head of production at UA.

Filmography
(as per AFI's database)

References

Rogers, Charles R